Atlantis is a 1991 French-Italian documentary film about oceans, filmed over a two-year period by Luc Besson.

Plot
Except for the last shot of the film, the entire documentary takes place underwater with only titles and music by Éric Serra existing beyond the imagery.

Parts
The film is divided into small parts:

Premier jour (first day)
La lumiére (light)
L'esprit (spirit)
Le mouvement (movement)
Le jeu (play)
La grâce (grace)
La nuit (night)
La foi (faith)
La tendresse (tenderness)
L'amour (love)
La haine (hate)

Dernier jour (last day)
La naissance (birth)

References

External links
 

French documentary films
Italian documentary films
1990s French-language films
1991 documentary films
1991 films
Films directed by Luc Besson
Films scored by Éric Serra
Documentary films about marine biology
Films produced by Luc Besson
Non-narrative films
1990s French films